Seán Hayes (29 March 1884 – 24 January 1928) was a Sinn Féin member of Dáil Éireann in Ireland. He was a newspaper editor (the Cork County Southern Star of Skibbereen) and political propagandist.

John Hayes was born in Clegg, Glandore, County Cork in 1888, the son of Denis Hayes, a farmer. He joined the civil service working as a sorter in the GPO, London from 1904 to 1912, returning to work in Dublin following that time. Subsequently, working in Skibbereen for the weekly Southern Star as an editor and a manager. He was a participant in the 1916 Easter Rising at the GPO, Dublin, for which he was arrested and spent time interned in Wormwood Scrubs.

He was elected unopposed for Cork West at the 1918 general election. He did not take the seat he had won in the British House of Commons, but like other members of his party he joined the revolutionary First Dáil of 1919 to 1921. He represented the constituency of Cork Mid, North, South, South East and West from 1921 to 1923. He became a member of the pro-Treaty faction of Sinn Féin before the 1922 general election. He did not seek re-election at the 1923 general election.

Hayes was arrested by the British forces during a raid on party offices in Dublin in November 1919. As a result, he was sentenced to three months imprisonment. He was re-arrested in 1920 during the War of Independence.  He was a member of the Irish Republican Army. He was also reputedly a member of Tom Barry's Flying Column in West Cork.

He married Ciss Crowley from Dunmanway, County Cork. They lived in Clontarf, Dublin. He died on 24 January 1928, and was buried in Glasnevin Cemetery on 26 January.

References

Sources
Who's Who of British Members of Parliament: Vol. III, edited by M. Stenton and S. Lees (The Harvester Press 1979)
 Townshend, Charles, Easter 1916: the Irish rebellion (London 2006)
 Townshend, C, The Republic: The Fight For Irish Independence (London 2014)

1884 births
1928 deaths
Early Sinn Féin TDs
Members of the 1st Dáil
Members of the 2nd Dáil
Members of the 3rd Dáil
Members of the Parliament of the United Kingdom for County Cork constituencies (1801–1922)
UK MPs 1918–1922
Politicians from County Cork
People from Skibbereen
People of the Irish Civil War (Pro-Treaty side)